Kathinka Zitz (née Halein; November 4, 1801March 8, 1877) was a German poet, short story writer, journalist, translator and novelist who has been called "the poet laureate of the German Revolution".

Biography
Kathinka Halein grew up in Mainz. Born to Anton Victor and Anna Marie Markowitzka Halein. The family was well off until the Napoleonic Wars. During the wars they were forced to live sparingly and moved in with Zitz-Halein's maternal grandmother's house. He mother died on May 26, 1825 and her father grew increasingly erratic and violent.

In the early 1820s she was given power of attorney and ran the family's business. Zitz-Halein worked as a governess for three years but returned to Mainz to care for her young sister. She provided income for the family by selling embroidery and teaching French lessons. In the 1830s she translated three novels by Victor Hugo. On June 3, 1837, she married a distant relative, the prominent Mainz attorney and 1848 revolutionary Dr. Franz Heinrich Zitz. They lived together for two years. She wrote for the Mannheimer Abendzeitung, opposing censorship and calling for reform in marriage, divorce and guardianship laws. In the German revolutions of 1848–49 she founded and was first president of the Humania Association, the largest revolutionary women's organization. A prolific short story writer, in the 1860s she wrote fictionalized biographical novels of Goethe, Heine, Rahel Varnhagen and Byron.

Published works 
Kathinka Zitz-Halein's published works as cited by An Encyclopedia of Continental Women Writers.

Translations:
Marion der Lorme, 1833.
Triboulet, oder der Königs Hofnarr, 1835.
Cromwell, 1835.

Novels:
Goethe, 1863.
Heine, 1864.
Rahel Varnhagen, 1864.
Byron, 1867.
Für einen übertreibenden Deutschthümler, 1991.

References

Further reading
Stanley Zucker: Kathinka Zitz-Halein and female civic activism in mid-nineteenth-century Germany. Southern Illinois Univ. Press 1991, .
Ludwig Julius Fränkel, "Zitz, Katharina und Franz" in Allgemeine Deutsche Biographie, Band 45 (Leipzig, 1900), S. 373-378. 
Bloomsbury Guide to Women's Literature

External links
Zitz-Halein, Kathinka in Encyclopedia of 1848 Revolutions
Four poems by Zitz-Halein at the Sophie database

1801 births
1877 deaths
German feminists
Writers from Mainz
People of the Revolutions of 1848
People from Rhenish Hesse
19th-century German women writers
19th-century German poets
19th-century German novelists
German women journalists
19th-century German journalists
19th-century German translators
French–German translators
Harold B. Lee Library-related rare books articles
19th-century women journalists